Michael Gene Smith (born September 5, 1955) is an American prelate, who was the eleventh Bishop of North Dakota between 2004 and 2019. He was consecrated on May 8, 2004.

Early life and education 
Smith is an enrolled member of the Potawatomi Nation of Oklahoma. He is chair of the Bishops’ Native Collaborative and Chair of the Communion Partner Bishops Advisory Committee.

Smith holds degrees in Psychology, Music, Social Work, and Theology from Oklahoma State University, Marymount College of Kansas, the University of Oklahoma and Seabury-Western Theological Seminary. He is currently pursuing a doctoral degree in preaching through Aquinas Institute of Theology in St. Louis, Missouri.

Prior to becoming bishop of North Dakota, Smith served at Episcopal churches Oklahoma and Minnesota.

Considered a theological conservative, Smith was one of the few Episcopalian American bishops to oppose same-sex marriages. After the General Convention of the Episcopal Church approved rites of marriage for LGBTQ couples in 2015, Smith said that he could not "in good conscience" allow same-sex marriages in his diocese.

Personal life 
Smith is married to the Rev. Lisa White Smith, also an Episcopal priest. The couple have three grown children and eight grandchildren.

See also
 List of Episcopal bishops of the United States
 Historical list of the Episcopal bishops of the United States

References

External links 
Episcopal Church website

Native American Episcopalians
American Episcopal priests
Living people
American religious leaders
1955 births
Citizen Potawatomi Nation people
Oklahoma State University alumni
University of Oklahoma alumni
Seabury-Western Theological Seminary alumni
Episcopal bishops of North Dakota